A Smithsonian trinomial (formally the Smithsonian Institution Trinomial System, abbreviated SITS) is a unique identifier assigned to archaeological sites in many states in the United States. They are composed of one or two digits coding for the state, typically two letters coding for the county or county-equivalent within the state, and one or more sequential digits representing the order in which the site was listed in that county. The Smithsonian Institution developed the site number system in the 1930s and 1940s, but it no longer maintains the system. Trinomials are now assigned by the individual states. The 48 states then in the union were assigned numbers in alphabetical order. Alaska was assigned number 49 and Hawaii was assigned number 50, after those states were admitted to the union. There is no Smithsonian trinomial number assigned for the District of Columbia or any United States territory.

Most states use trinomials of the form "nnAAnnnn", but some specify a space or dash between parts of the identifier, i.e., "nn AA nnnn" or "nn-AA-nnnn". Some states use variations of the trinomial system. Arizona, California, Connecticut, Maine, Rhode Island, and Vermont use two-letter abbreviations of the state name instead of the Smithsonian number. Alaska uses three-letter abbreviations for USGS map quadrangles in place of the county code. Arizona uses a five-part identifier based on USGS maps, specifying quadrangles, then rectangles within a quadrangle, a sequential number within the rectangle, and a code identifying the agency issuing the sequential number. California uses a three-letter abbreviation for counties. Connecticut and Rhode Island do not use any sub-state codes, with site identifiers consisting of the state abbreviation and a sequential number series for the whole state. Delaware uses a single letter code for counties and adds a block code (A-K) within each county, with sequential numbers for each block. Hawaii uses a four-part identifier, "50" for the state, a two-digit code for the island, then a two-digit code to designate the USGS topographical quad, plus a four digit sequential site number for sites on each island.

Archaeological site identification codes used by states

References

Archaeological sites in the United States
Unique identifiers
Smithsonian Institution